Cryptocarya williwilliana  is a shrub or small rainforest tree and is commonly known as the small leaved laurel. It is confined to dry rainforest on steep rocky limestone slopes or at the base of limestone cliffs. It grows in remote areas at an altitude of 250 to 800 metres in the Macleay River valley near Kempsey, Australia. Maximum height is around 6 metres.

The small leaved laurel is considered rare, with a ROTAP rating of 2RCi. This plant has been described and studied by Bernie Hyland and Alexander Floyd.

The leaves are veiny, ovate and attractive, between 1.5 and 4 cm in diameter. Faintly scented white flowers form between October and January.  A black drupe forms in late summer and early autumn. Germination from fresh seed is slow but reliable.

References

External links

Flora of New South Wales
williwilliana
Laurales of Australia
Vulnerable flora of Australia
Trees of Australia
Taxa named by Bernard Hyland